Sıtkı Üke (1876; Salonica (Thessaloniki) – 1941; Istanbul) was a Turkish career officer and politician. He was a major general of the Ottoman Army and the first head general of the Turkish Army.  Sıtkı grew up in the same town as Atatürk, the founder of modern-day Turkey, who referred to Sıtkı as "big brother" and conferred on him the surname Üke, or "honor", during the establishment of the modern Turkish state.

See also
List of high-ranking commanders of the Turkish War of Independence

Sources

External links

1876 births
1941 deaths
Politicians from Thessaloniki
Macedonian Turks
Republican People's Party (Turkey) politicians
Deputies of Tokat
Ottoman Army officers
Turkish Army generals
Ottoman military personnel of the Italo-Turkish War
Ottoman military personnel of World War I
Ottoman prisoners of war
World War I prisoners of war held by the United Kingdom
Turkish military personnel of the Greco-Turkish War (1919–1922)
Ottoman Imperial School of Military Engineering alumni
Recipients of the Medal of Independence with Red Ribbon (Turkey)
Burials at Turkish State Cemetery
Military personnel from Thessaloniki